Hainisch is a surname. Notable people with the surname include:

Leopold Hainisch (1891–1979), Austrian actor and film director
Marianne Hainisch (1839–1936), founder and leader of the Austrian women's movement
Michael Hainisch (1858–1940), Austrian politician

See also 
Heinisch